Der Neger Erwin is a 1981 West German film directed by and starring Herbert Achternbusch. It was entered into the 31st Berlin International Film Festival.

Cast
 Herbert Achternbusch as Der Neger Erwin
 Annamirl Bierbichler as Die Wirtin Susn
 Helga Loder as Starke Dame
 Alois Hitzenbichler as 1. starker Mann
 Franz Baumgartner as 2. starker Mann
 Helmut Neumayer as Polizeihauptmann
 Dietmar Schneider as Leutnant
 Siegfried Zügel as Kranführer
 Gabi Geist as Reporterin
 Josef Bierbichler as Museumwächter
 Lisa Fitz as Italienerin
 Bert Huber as 2. Gast
 Karolina Herbig as Mam
 Lotte Koll as Weinende Frau
 Andreas Achternbusch as Polizistlein

References

External links

1981 films
1980s avant-garde and experimental films
German avant-garde and experimental films
West German films
1980s German-language films
Films directed by Herbert Achternbusch
1980s German films